Allan McDonald (born 1 March 1951) is a former professional tennis player from Australia.

Biography
McDonald, a Sydney born player, represented the Australian Junior Davis Cup team in the late 1960s. He won the boys' singles title at the 1969 Australian Open and partnered with Greg Perkins to win the boys' doubles event at the 1970 Australian Open.

On the men's circuit he competed until 1975 but was unable to replicate his junior success. His best performance in a grand slam tournament came at the 1971 Wimbledon Championships, where he made the round of 16 in the mixed doubles, partnering Patti Hogan.

He now runs a tennis school in the NSW Central Coast town of Toukley.

References

External links
 
 

1951 births
Living people
Australian male tennis players
Australian Open (tennis) junior champions
Tennis players from Sydney
Grand Slam (tennis) champions in boys' singles
Grand Slam (tennis) champions in boys' doubles